Hristo Tatarchev (Macedonian and ; 16 December 1869 – 5 January 1952) was a Macedonian Bulgarian doctor, revolutionary and one of the founders of the IMARO. Tatarchev authored several political journalistic works between the First and Second World War. He is considered an ethnic Macedonian in North Macedonia.

Biography

Tatarchev was born in the town of Resen, then in the Manastir vilayet of the Ottoman Empire, to a rich family. His father Nikola Tatarchev was a successful merchant, and leading member of the Bulgarian Exarchist community in Resen, and his mother Katerina was a descendant of a prominent family. Hristo Tatarchev received his initial education in Resen, then he moved to Eastern Rumelia and studied in Bratsigovo (1882) and eventually at the secondary school for boys in Plovdiv (1883–87). It was at that time when he participated in the Unification of Bulgaria and enrolled in a students' legion, which took part in the Serbo-Bulgarian War of 1885. Tatarchev was expelled from school because of "insubordination" and he moved to Romania, where he continued his secondary education. Later he studied medicine at the University of Zurich (1887–1890) and completed his degree in Medicine in Berlin (July 1892). He moved to Thessaloniki in 1892, where he worked as a physician at the local Bulgarian secondary school for boys.

He was a founding member of the Bulgarian Macedonian-Adrianople Revolutionary Committee (renamed to IMARO in 1906), which was established on 23 October 1893 in Thessaloniki. In the following year, he was elected President of the Central Committee of IMARO. Tatarchev participated in the Thessaloniki Congress of BMARC in 1896.

In early 1901 he was caught by the Ottoman authorities and sent into exile for 5 years in Bodrum Castle in Asia Minor. Although he was released on 19 August 1902, Tatarchev did not give up the revolutionary fight and in August 1902 he became a representative of the Foreign Committee of the IMRO in Sofia. Being such, he met with the Minister of Foreign Affairs of Russia, Vladimir Lamsdorf (1845–1907), who had arrived in Bulgaria at the end of 1902. Tatarchev presented Lamsdorf with an IMARO-designed plan of reforms to be introduced in Macedonia. Tatarchev and Vladimir Lamsdorf organised a meeting to review the revolutionary ideas which could result in a successful revolt.During the Ilinden–Preobrazhenie Uprising of 1903, Tatarchev guided the revolutionary fight, as the emigrant representation turned out to be the sole governing body of the organization. After the uprising, he came into conflict with the supporters of Yane Sandanski and did not participate in the activities of the IMRO at the Kyustendil Congress in March 1908, where he was appointed as an adviser to the Foreign Committee of the IMRO. After the Young Turk Revolution he openly supported the Union of the Bulgarian Constitutional Clubs, but did not participate in its activities. In 1910 he was elected a reserve member of the Central Committee of IMRO. When Bulgaria entered the Balkan Wars and the First World War, Tatarchev was sent to the front as a regimental physician. At the end of the wars he was one of the initiators of the Temporary representation of the former IMARO.
In the fall of 1920, he entered the Macedonian Federative Organization. Shortly after that, Tatarchev was forced to emigrate to Italy, because of significant discord between then IMRO's leader Todor Alexandrov and him. There he wrote his memoirs, and all the time until the Second World War he wrote articles for the newspapers "Macedonia", "Zarya", "Vardar". In his newspapers, he actively criticized the Serbian and Yugoslavian government for the Serbianisation of the Macedonian Slavs.  Tatarchev became a close friend of the new leader of the IMRO Ivan Mihailov. He lived briefly in his native Resen during the Second World War, when Macedonia was annexed by Bulgaria (1941–1944). Later he returned to Sofia, but in 1943 after the bombings there Tatarchev moved to Nova Zagora. The Germans offered him in 1944 to become a President of the Independent State of Macedonia, but he refused, because the Red Army was entering Bulgaria. Bulgaria also ordered its troops to prepare for withdrawal from former Yugoslavia. After the end of the Second World War, he and his family were persecuted by the authorities of PR Bulgaria and DFR Yugoslavia. Thus Tatarchev returned to Turin, where he also communicated with Ivan Mihailov, who moved to Italy as well. He died on 5 January 1952.

Relatives 
Tatarchev’s relatives were also involved in the Macedonian revolutionary movement. His brother Mihail was an activist of IMRO and the mayor of Resen during the Bulgarian occupation of Serbia in the First World War, when he was killed. 

His nephew, Asen Tatarchev, was also an IMRO activist in interwar period. In 1946 he was sentenced to death, later commuted to life imprisonment, by the Yugoslav authorities for collaborating with the Bulgarian occupational authorities during World War II. 

Tatarchev’s grand nephew, Ivan Tatarchev, became Bulgaria’s prosecutor general after the fall of communism and was elected honorary chairman of the IMRO – Bulgarian National Movement in the 1990s.

Tatarchev married Sophia Logothetis, a daughter of the Greek consul in Bitola.

Honours
In December 2009, his remains were brought from Turin to Bulgaria by VMRO-BND, a modern political party claiming descent from the IMRO. Tatarchev's reburial took place in Sofia, on 23 October 2010, exactly 117 years since the founding of the IMRO.

Tatarchev Nunatak on Oscar II Coast in Graham Land, Antarctica is named after Hristo Tatarchev.

References

External links 

 A collection of Hristo Tatarchev's interwar publications 
 Hristo Tatarchev's memoirs 

1869 births
1952 deaths
People from Resen, North Macedonia
Members of the Internal Macedonian Revolutionary Organization
Bulgarian revolutionaries
Bulgarian military doctors
Exiles from the Ottoman Empire
People of the Serbo-Bulgarian War
Bulgarian military personnel of the Balkan Wars
Bulgarian military personnel of World War I
Macedonian Bulgarians
Bulgarian emigrants to Italy
Burials at Central Sofia Cemetery
University of Zurich alumni
Humboldt University of Berlin alumni
Bulgarian nationalists
Recipients of the Order of Military Merit (Bulgaria)